This is a list of Eurodisco artists and their popular songs.

Note: This list applies only to artists of the Eurodisco genre in Europe in the 1980s and the genre revival in the 90s and 2000s. This list does not contain European disco artists of the 1970s.



B

C

D

F

J

L

M

P

S

V

Notes

 
Eurodisco